Methven or Methvin may refer to:

Places
 Methven, New Zealand, in the Canterbury region of New Zealand
 Methven, Perth and Kinross, village in Scotland

People
 Methven (surname)

See also
Methuen (disambiguation)
Battle of Methven, fought by Robert the Bruce